Phil Price (born 1965) is a New Zealand artist best known for his large-scale kinetic sculptures. Price's work incorporates engineering and design in works inspired by the natural world.

Price received a BFA degree in sculpture from the University of Canterbury School of Fine Arts.

Public sculptures

 Liberace (2019). Permanently installed on Waiheke Island, New Zealand.  
Ipomoea (2019). Temporarily installed during the Sculpture by the Sea festival. Cottesloe Beach, Perth, Australia. 
Snake (2013). Temporarily installed during the Sculpture by the Sea festival in Bondi, Sydney, Australia. Acquired by the City of Aarhus, where it is currently installed in the public square Mølleparken.
evolution-trees (2012). Canberra, Australia. Permanently installed facing the Canberra Airport. 
Organism (2009). Wellington, New Zealand. Part of the Victoria University of Wellington permanent collection.  Dinornis Maximus (2008). Canberra, Australia. Permanently installed on the median strip of Yarra Glen Drive, Woden. Knowledge (2006). Christchurch, New Zealand. Permanently installed outside the Upper Riccarton Library in Christchurch.   Nucleus (2006). Christchurch, New Zealand. Permanently installed at the meeting point of High, Lichfield and Manchester streets. 
 Zephyrometer (2004). Evans Bay, Wellington. The work was struck by lightning in 2014, resulting in significant damage. It was repaired and restored the following year.Flip (2010). Taupo, New Zealand. Permanent commission by the Taupo Sculpture Trust.  Protoplasm (2002). Wellington, New Zealand.Wiggly Wagon and other sculptures (2003), Queen Mary Hospital, Hanmer Springs. Removed in 2005.Cytoplasm. Auckland.Tree of Life. (2013). McClelland Sculpture Park, Langwarrin, Victoria, Australia.Ratytus''. McClelland Sculpture Park, Langwarrin, Victoria, Australia.

Permanent collections
Museum of New Zealand Te Papa Tongarewa.
Victoria University of Wellington.

References

External links
Official web site
Phil Price at Te Papa

1965 births
University of Canterbury alumni
People from Nelson, New Zealand
Living people
People associated with the Museum of New Zealand Te Papa Tongarewa
20th-century New Zealand sculptors
20th-century New Zealand male artists
21st-century New Zealand sculptors
21st-century New Zealand male artists